Tajna Armia Polska, TAP (Secret Polish Army) was a Resistance movement founded in November 1939 in German-occupied Poland, which was active in the areas of the Warsaw, Podlasie, Kielce and Lublin Voivodships.

Founders were:
 Lieutenant Colonel Jan Henryk Włodarkiewicz "Darwicz" – Chief of the Staff
 Cavalry Captain Witold Pilecki "Witold"
 Lieutenant Colonel  "Stefan"

The organization had up to 19,000 members at its peak. In 1940 it joined the Konfederacja Narodu. In 1941 it became part of the Armia Krajowa (Home Army).

Bibliography 
 Kazimierz Malinowski, Tajna Armia Polska. Znak. Konfederacja Zbrojna. Zarys genezy, organizacji i działalności, Warszawa 1986. 
 Adam Cyra, Ochotnik do Auschwitz - Witold Pilecki 1901-1948, Oświęcim 2000. 

World War II resistance movements
Military units and formations of Poland in World War II
Polish underground organisations during World War II